Moala (beetle) is a genus of beetles in the family Cerambycidae, containing the following species:

 Moala crassus Dillon & Dillon, 1952
 Moala flavovittatus Dillon & Dillon, 1952

References

Acanthocinini